The 2020–21 Arkansas State Red Wolves women's basketball team represented Arkansas State University during the 2020–21 NCAA Division I women's basketball season. The basketball team finished the season with interim head coach and former assistant Destinee Rogers after second year head coach Matt Daniel resigned on Dec 13th 2021.The team played all home games at the First National Bank Arena along with the Arkansas State Red Wolves men's basketball team. They were members of the Sun Belt Conference.

Previous season 
The Red Wolves finished the 2019–20 season 11–19, 8–10 in Sun Belt play to finish seventh in the conference. They made it to the 2019-20 Sun Belt Conference women's basketball tournament where they were defeated by South Alabama in the First Round. Following the season, all conference tournaments as well as all postseason play was cancelled due to the COVID-19 pandemic.

Offseason

Departures

Transfers

Recruiting

Roster

Schedule and results

|-
!colspan=9 style=| Non-conference Regular Season
|-

|-
!colspan=9 style=| Conference Regular Season
|-

|-
!colspan=9 style=| Sun Belt Tournament

See also
 2020–21 Arkansas State Red Wolves men's basketball team

References

Arkansas State Red Wolves women's basketball seasons
Arkansas State Red Wolves
Arkansas State Red Wolves women's basketball
Arkansas State Red Wolves women's basketball